Joseph Frederick Hassler (1905-1917) was an American professional baseball shortstop. He played in Major League Baseball (MLB) for the Philadelphia Athletics and St. Louis Browns.

External links

Retrosheet

Major League Baseball shortstops
Philadelphia Athletics players
St. Louis Browns players
Baltimore Orioles (IL) players
Portland Beavers players
Reading Keystones players
Waterbury Brasscos players
Wheeling Stogies players
Baseball players from Arkansas
1905 births
1971 deaths